Aseem Malhotra is a controversial British cardiologist, public health campaigner, author, and advocate against the use of COVID vaccines. He campaigns for people to reduce sugar in their diet, promotes a low-carb and high-fat diet, and encourages the reduction of medical overprescribing. He was the first science director of Action on Sugar in 2014. He was listed as one of The Sunday Times 500 most influential people in 2016 and was twice recognized as one of the top fifty black and minority ethnic community member pioneers in the UK's National Health Service by the Health Service Journal. Malhotra is co-author of a book called The Pioppi Diet.

His views on diet and health have been criticized by the British Heart Foundation as "misleading and wrong", and his public questioning of the need ever to use statins has been condemned as a danger to public health. His "Pioppi diet" was named by the British Dietetic Association as one of the "top 5 worst celeb diets to avoid in 2018". During the COVID-19 pandemic, Malhotra published a book called The 21-Day Immunity Plan, which claims that following the diet can quickly help people reduce their risk from the virus; such claims are not backed by medical research evidence. Despite initially campaigning for the COVID vaccine, he later campaigned against the use of COVID mRNA vaccines contrary to the available evidence.

Biography

Early influences

Malhotra was born in New Delhi in India in October 1977. He was the younger son of two doctors: Kailash Chand and Anisha Malhotra.  The family moved to Britain in 1978 when his father had a clinical attachment at Alder Hey Hospital and was studying for a Diploma in Tropical Medicine at Liverpool University.  Both parents became General Practitioners in Ashton-under-Lyme, Greater Manchester.  In 1988 Malhotra's brother Amit, who was two years older than Malhotra and had been born with Down's syndrome, died of heart failure aged thirteen. This inspired Malhotra with the ambition to become a cardiologist. Malhotra was educated at Manchester Grammar School. Malhotra's father went on to become the first Asian to be elected as honorary vice-president and deputy chair of the council of the British Medical Association and received an O.B.E for long-standing service to the NHS. Malhotra's mother's religious faith was important to her and Malhotra observed that she fasted weekly by only consuming one meal on a fast day. He was quoted later as claiming his mother's vegetarian diet contributed to her 'premature and painful death' and said he hoped "we can learn that much of these ills are preventable."

Career

Malhotra studied medicine at the University of Edinburgh and graduated in 2001. He spent his foundation years as a doctor in Scotland, at Wishaw General Hospital then at the Royal Infirmary of Edinburgh and finally at Liberton Hospital which specialises in care of the elderly.  He completed his post-graduate medical diploma during two years working at the Manchester Royal Infirmary. He held specialist registrar positions at St James's University Hospital in Leeds and Blackpool Victoria Hospital.

Malhotra has held cardiology posts with the UK National Health Service as a cardiology specialist registrar at Harefield Hospital, at the Royal Free Hospital in Hampstead and as an Honorary Consultant Cardiologist at Frimley Park Hospital. He is a former Consultant Clinical Associate to the Academy of Medical Royal Colleges and is a visiting professor at Bahiana School of Medicine and Public Health, Salvador, Brazil. In 2015 he was appointed as a trustee of the King's Fund and was reappointed for a further three years in 2018.
 
In addition to his work as a cardiologist, he has been described as a "highly regarded public health campaigner" and an anti-obesity expert who is "passionate about tackling the companies and policies responsible for creating ... an obesogenic environment". Malhotra explains that his professional work has motivated his public health campaigning:" ..having seen the unspeakable suffering caused by diet-related diseases, I would much rather these patients did not develop them in the first place." In 2013 he was recognized in the inaugural list of the top 50 BME Pioneers in the NHS Health Service Journal, for his research on sugar rich diets and obesity and cardio-vascular disease and for his public health campaigns, including profit-making of big corporations at the expense of public health, unhealthy hospital meals and sale of junk food in hospitals   The judges commented that "Yes. He challenges people".  In 2014 he was recognized for a second year running in the Health Services Journal top 50 BME Pioneers: described by the judges as "An upcoming star", the entry recognized that he had ignited a debate about over-investigation, over-diagnosis and overmedication and brought media attention to the BMJ's "Too much medicine" campaign.

At the end of 2013, Malhotra won the accolade of being named a "Food  Hero" for the Children's Food Campaign for his campaigning against junk food being marketed to children and sugar filled vending machines in hospitals.  When Action on Sugar was founded in 2014, he was its first Science Director. Later in that year, his campaigning on sugar led to his being featured in the Evening Standard as being one of ten of London's brightest stars working in science and technology. In 2018 the Guardian's health correspondent, Sarah Boseley, labelled Malhotra as a "dissident scientist", "statin critic" and "cholesterol sceptic". In 2021, Malhotra was appointed chair of the scientific advisory committee of the small UK charity The Public Health Collaboration. On 20 Feb 2023, the Public Health Collaboration announced that Malhotra was no longer part of the organisation.

Public health campaigns and misinformation

Reducing the consumption of sugar and junk foods

Malhotra campaigns about reducing the consumption of sugar and junk foods, particularly in the diet of children.  The fact that most people in Britain, including children, eat too much sugar and that this contributes to obesity is acknowledged by the NHS healthy eating guidelines. However, Malhotra argues that it is unrealistic to expect individuals to avoid cheap, unhealthy, heavily marketed foods and that changes to regulation are needed.  He draws analogies to the regulations on tobacco that were necessary to reduce smoking.  He also thinks that vending machines in hospitals selling sweets and junk foods send the wrong message. At the time of the London Olympics in 2012, he criticized the choice of sponsors: writing that "In the context of an obesity epidemic I find it obscene that the Olympics chooses to associate itself with fast food, sugary drinks, chocolate and alcohol." 

His campaigns on these topics have brought him recognition and accolades including as a children's food hero in 2013, one of the top 50 BME pioneers in the NHS in 2013, one of London's brightest stars working in Science and Technology in 2014, and one of the Timetop 500 most influential people in the UK in 2016.

Pioppi diet and low carb diet advocacy

The established consensus on what constitutes a healthy diet for the general population of adults in the UK is described in the NHS Eatwell plate Guidelines.  The recommendation is for a balanced diet consisting of carbohydrates, protein and fat.  Foods high in fat, salt or sugar, should not be eaten often and should be eaten only in small amounts. The guidelines apply to the general population of adults: people with medical conditions should consult their doctor for individual advice and people with medical or dietary conditions may need to consult a dietician to tailor the guidelines.

The Pioppi Diet 
Malhotra is a proponent of fad diets such as low-carbohydrate diets and in 2017 he co-authored a low carb diet book called The Pioppi Diet, which provides a 21-day eating plan. Malhotra's personal royalties from the book are donated to charity.  The book recommends the daily consumption of two to four table spoons of extra-virgin olive oil, a small handful of tree nuts, five to seven portions of fibrous vegetables and low sugar fruits and oily fish at least three times a week. It advises people to avoid all added sugars, fruit juice, honey, and syrups, packaged refined carbohydrates, in particular anything flour based including all bread, pastries, cakes, biscuits, muesli bars, packaged noodles, pasta, couscous and rice and seed oils. Very dark chocolate, butter, coconut oil, cheese, yoghurt are allowed. The moderate consumption of alcohol is allowed but only within the limits set by the NHS and a maximum of 500g of red meat per week is recommended in line with the recommendations of the World Cancer Research Fund. It promotes a higher fat intake with fewer carbs than the NHS reference intakes.  The diet is called Pioppi after the Italian village recognized as the home of the Mediterranean diet. The authors use the lifestyles of residents of the town to explain the principles of a healthier Lifestyle and the book also explains how policy changes are needed to change the obesogenic environment. 

The Pioppi diet book has endorsements from then Member of Parliament (MP) Andy Burnham and Dame Sue Bailey, Chair of the Academy of Medical Royal Colleges. Keith Vaz, who was the chair of the all-party parliamentary group on diabetes, promoted it to fellow MPs and then MP and Labour Deputy Leader, Tom Watson, who claimed to have lost seven stones in less than twelve months by following the diet, putting his type 2 diabetes into remission in the process.

The British Nutrition Foundation's response to the Pioppi diet explained that there is no single definition of the Mediterranean diet, which is generally considered to be a healthy way of eating.  However they identified that the advice in the Pioppi diet to cut out starchy carbohydrates is not consistent with a Mediterranean diet which would include bread, pasta and rice.  In addition, Mediterranean diets are normally low in saturated fat which is contrary to the advice in the book that people can eat as much saturated fat as they like. Rosemary Stanton also says that in most traditional Mediterranean diets, bread would be a part of every meal.

The Pioppi diet was listed as one of the "top 5 worst celeb diets to avoid in 2018" by the British Dietetic Association.  According to the BDA and others, it is a new spin on a low-carb high fat diet that "hijacked" the term Mediterranean diet: substituting cauliflower for rice or pizza base and cooking with coconut oil are not parts of the traditional diet of the villagers of Pioppi.

Saturated fat, cholesterol and statins

The UK National Health Service website on healthy eating states that "Too much fat in your diet, especially saturated fats, can raise your cholesterol, which increases the risk of heart disease". This advice is part of a medical and dietary mainstream consensus about saturated fat shared with the World Health Organization and the health authorities of many other nations. Current guidelines for doctors from the UK National Institute for Health and Care Excellence for reduction of the risk of cardiovascular disease include giving advice on lifestyle changes before prescribing statins.  The UK National Health Service website explains to patients that the lifestyle changes that doctors will recommend before prescribing statins include eating a healthy diet, exercising, stopping smoking, limiting alcohol and maintaining a healthy weight. Prof Mark Baker, Director of the Centre for Guidelines at NICE, stated that the use of statins in people with established heart disease was not controversial and expanding the prescription of statins to people with a 10% risk of disease was recent but based on robust evidence.

Malhotra believes that saturated fat is part of a healthy diet: he is known to put a tablespoon of butter and coconut oil into his coffee. He has attacked the standard advice on saturated fat consumption to reduce the risk of cardiovascular disease.
Malhotra instead directs his attention to the effects of sugar and in particular to its role in diabetes.

In 2017 Malhotra wrote an opinion piece for the British Journal of Sports Medicine which made the claim that saturated fat did "not clog the arteries" and that heart disease can be cured with a daily walk and "eating real food". The British Heart Foundation criticised these "misleading and wrong" claims and several researchers took issue with the methodology of the report on which Malhotra based his claims.  Prof Louis Levy, the head of nutrition science at Public Health England says "There is good evidence that a high intake of saturated fat increases your risk of heart disease".

Malhotra denounces what he calls the government's "obsession" with levels of total cholesterol, which, he says, has led to the overmedication of millions of people with statins, and has diverted attention from the "more egregious" risk factor of atherogenic dyslipidaemia. He has questioned the worth of statins, and campaigned against their use. With Robert H. Lustig and Maryanne Demasi, Malhotra authored a 2017 article in The Pharmaceutical Journal which disputes the Lipid hypothesis, the link between blood cholesterol levels and occurrence of heart disease. The article was criticized by two medical experts, for being based on cherry-picked science and for creating the impression that most doctors don't believe that diet and exercise are as important as drugs, and that drugs and lifestyle changes are an either/or option. Cardiologist Tim Chico commented that "high cholesterol has been proven beyond all doubt to contribute to coronary artery disease and heart attack ... to say the cholesterol hypothesis is dead is simply incorrect."  Rory Collins, an Oxford medical professor, has also sharply criticised pronouncements about statins, and accused Malhotra of endangering lives. Rory Collins has been quoted as saying that scare stories about statins could be as dangerous to public health as Andrew Wakefield's bogus claims about vaccination and autism.

At an informal dinner organised on 27 July 2022 by the International Medical Graduates Group during the British Medical Association's Annual Representative meeting, Malhotra was given an award. A photograph and tweets by the IMG and Malhotra implied this was an official BMA award. BMA President Chaand Nagpaul's apologised to conference and clarified that 'this was not a formal BMA award and neither I nor the BMA endorse the views held by Aseem Malhotra.'

Too Much Medicine campaign 

Malhotra has stated that over-diagnosis and over-treatment is "the greatest threat to our healthcare system". He has also held that in the UK at least £2bn is wasted each year on unnecessary tests and treatment. He co-ordinated the Too Much Medicine campaign by the BMJ and the Academy of Medical Royal Colleges. His claims were supported by Sir Richard Thompson a past president of the Royal College of Physicians.

COVID-19

COVID-19 and diet 
In 2020 during the COVID-19 pandemic and before there were any approved vaccines for COVID-19, Malhotra published a book claiming that following his dietary advice could grant "metabolic optimization" which would, in 21 days, decrease the risk of viral infection. David Gorski criticized the book because the biggest single risk factor for COVID-19 infection is age, which people cannot change.  Gorski said that while Malhotra had a germ of a good point and that it was undeniable that losing weight for someone who is obese would reduce their risk of complications, the claims about the book were massively exaggerated and there was no specific evidence for the impact of lifestyle recommendations on the risk of COVID-19 or that Malhotra's version of a healthy diet was better or worse than any other healthy lifestyle recommendation.  Gorski was also concerned that telling people that they should be in control of their susceptibility to disease may have an element of victim blaming because that shifts responsibility for disease onto individuals, many of whom are unable to follow the kind of diet Malhotra advocates.

COVID-19 vaccine 
Malhotra initially campaigned in favour of taking the COVID vaccine. Later however, he campaigned against the use of COVID mRNA vaccines contrary to the available evidence.  In November 2021, Malhotra appeared on GB News to discuss an abstract for an academic poster published by Steven Gundry and which the American Heart Association had warned may contain "potential errors". Malhotra claimed that the abstract supported "a significantly increased risk from 11% at five years, the risk of heart attack, to 25%." after taking mRNA vaccines against COVID-19. Full Fact warned that "Serious concerns have been raised as to the quality of the research".

In September 2022, Malhotra publicly campaigned against the use of COVID mRNA vaccines. An AFP factcheck warned of his claims: "This is false; experts say his research misleads on the risks of vaccination by cherry-picking evidence and relying on flawed studies, and public health authorities agree the benefits of the shots outweigh the risks."

The Editor of The Lancet, Richard Horton, reported on a presentation by Malhotra 7 November 2022 at a public meeting organised by the Association of Naturopathic Practitioners at Friends Meeting House, London. 'Malhotra's method of argument deserves scrutiny to understand why it persuades some people. Frame one's view as the reluctant endpoint of a personal journey. Quote respected scientists. Stand up to corporates. Place oneself firmly on the side of patients. Emphasise well described concerns about the presentation of research evidence. Allude to correlations. Make the call for access to raw data an issue of trust and transparency.After the meeting descended into chaos, Horton observed that 'this descent into unreason is what happens when you inflame public anxieties. It needs to stop.' Frank Han, a paediatric cardiologist, reviewed Malhotra's 20 claims in the presentation and concluded the majority were unsupported by scientific evidence.

On 13 January 2023, during a BBC interview on the prescription of statins, Malhotra made unprompted claims about excess cardiac deaths and Covid vaccines. The BBC apologised that these claims were not challenged at the time. The British Heart Foundation and scientific experts including noted immunologist Peter Openshaw subsequently refuted the claims.

Selected bibliography

Books
The Pioppi Diet: A 21-Day Lifestyle Plan (with Donal O'Neill), Penguin Books, 2017 
The 21-Day Immunity Plan, Yellow Kite, 2020 
A Statin-Free Life: A revolutionary life plan for tackling heart disease - without the use of statins, Hodder & Stoughton, 2021

References

External links

21st-century English medical doctors
Anti-obesity activists
High-fat diet advocates
Low-carbohydrate diet advocates
Living people
People from Tameside (district)
Pseudoscientific diet advocates
British health activists
1977 births
COVID-19 misinformation
British anti-vaccination activists